The City Municipality of Ptuj is a municipality in northeastern Slovenia. The seat of the municipality is the town of Ptuj. The area is part of the traditional Styria region. The entire municipality is now included in the Drava Statistical Region. The population of the municipality is about 23,700.

Settlements

In addition to the municipal seat of Ptuj, the municipality also includes the following settlements:

 Grajena
 Grajenščak
 Kicar
 Krčevina pri Vurbergu
 Mestni Vrh
 Pacinje
 Podvinci
 Spodnji Velovlek
 Spuhlja

References

External links

 City Municipality of Ptuj website 
 City Municipality of Ptuj on Geopedia

 
Municipalities in Styria (Slovenia)
1994 establishments in Slovenia